Arangkada (Ang Trip Mo Kung Aga) is a Philippine television newscast and talkshow broadcast by GMA Iloilo for the Western Visayas region. Originally anchored by Mark Nunieza and Charlene Belvis, it premiered on October 8, 2007. The newscast concluded on April 24, 2015.  Jovanni Gustilo,  Carol Velagio and Kate Chavez served as the final hosts.

Overview
The show pre-empted the 2nd hour of Unang Hirit in the 6:15 am to 7:15 am block (Philippine Standard Time). This show is now also simulcast over GMA Roxas (Channel 5), GMA Kalibo (Channel 2) and GMA Sipalay (Channel 10).

On April 24, 2015, Arangkada was formally cancelled after more than 7 years without saying goodbyes to the viewing public, due to the streamlining of GMA regional network's operations that caused a massive lay-off of 24 employees of GMA Iloilo alone, including Arangkada hosts and staff.

GMA Iloilo would not have a regional morning newscast until 5 years later, with the launch of GMA Regional TV Early Edition on August 31, 2020.

Final hosts
 Kate Chaves
 Jovani Gustilo
 Carol Velagio

Former hosts
 Mark Nunieza
 Charlene Belvis
 Mama Monyeka
 Joan Jalandoni
 Jason Gregorio
 Enrico Surita Jr.
 Mark "Makoy" Abapo

References

GMA Network news shows
GMA Integrated News and Public Affairs shows
Television in Iloilo City
Philippine television news shows
2007 Philippine television series debuts
2015 Philippine television series endings